This is a list of various Razer gaming hardware products. Individual products may have their own article, please see the navbox at the bottom if a product is not listed here.

Mice

Mouse Bungee 
 Mouse Bungee	2010
 Mouse Bungee V2	2011
 Mouse Bungee V3	2020 - Chroma

Keyboards

Speakers 
 Mako-2008-2.1 speakers
 Ferox-2011-Portable gaming speakers
 Leviathan-2014-Soundbar
 Nommo-2018-Chroma/Pro

April Fools 

 HellRazer: Triple Helix	2009
 Venom	2010
 Talon Exoskeleton	2011
 SnakeEyes	2012
 Naga Phone	2013
 Eidolon	2014
 Project McFly	2015
 Project BreadWinner	2016
 SAiSO - RazerRobot	2017
 Project Venom v2	2018
 Ping!	2019
 Stay Home - Game On	2020
 Rapunzel - Glow Up	2021
 Hypersense Suit 2022

Headsets 

 Barracuda HP-1	2006
 Barracuda AC-1	2007
 Piranha	2007
 Carcharias	2008
 Moray	2008
 Megalodon	2009
 Orca	2010
 Banshee	2010
 Tiamat 7.1	2011
 Chimaera 5.1	2011
 Electra	2011
 Carcharias	2012
 BlackShark	2012
 Hammerhead	2013
 Adaro	2014
 Man O' War	2016
 Thresher	2017
 Electra V2	2017
 Meka	2017
 Tiamat 7.1 V2	2017
 Nari	2018
 Ifrit	2018
 Tetra	2019
 Kraken Kitty Ears Edition	2019
 BlackShark	2020
 Opus	2020
 Kaira Pro	2020
 Kraken	2012
Kaira pro 2021

Headphone stands 

 Metal Headphone Stand	2014	Metal
 Base Station Chroma	2017	USB Hub	Mercury/Quartz
 Base Station Chroma V2	2020	USB Hub	Mercury/Quartz

Microphone 

 Seiren Pro	2015
 Seiren X	2017
 Seiren Elite	2018
 Seiren Emote	2019
 Seiren Mini	2020
 Seiren V2 X	2021
 Seiren V2 Pro	2021
 Seiren BT

Promotional Item 

 Team Razer V2 Silicone coaster
 Razer Dog Tag
 Razer 8GB Thumb drive
 Razer THS Pennant
 Razer Corrugated puzzle - Deathstalker
 Razer Corrugated puzzle - Ouroboros
 Razer THS Bottle
 Team Razer Pin
 Razer THS Spinner
 Team Razer V2 Spinner
 Razer L33T Pack
 Razer Bottle Opener
 Razer Basic Messenger Bag
 Razer THS Plushie Pillow
 Razer Patches
 Razer Ice Cube Tray
 Team Razer V2 Lanyard
 Razer Chroma Keycap Chain
 Team Razer V2 Keychain
 Team Razer V2 Keychain (Matte Black)
 Razer Cellphone Stand
 Razer Gaming headset stand metal
 Razer Carabiner Pouch
 Razer Headphone Pouch V2
 Razer Accessory Pouch V2
 Razer Keyboard Anti-Dust Cover
 Armadillo
 Cable Winder
 Razer Cable Ties

Mats 
 Boomslang	1999	Soft
 Mystify/Razer	2003	Hard curved
 ExactMat + ExactRest	2004	Hard	Speed+Control
 Mantis	2008	Soft	Speed+Control
 Destructor	2008	Hard	White
 Goliathus	2008	Soft	Speed/Control/Sizes3
 Megasoma	2009	Soft	White
 Sphex	2009	Soft	V2/V3/mini
 Kabuto	2009	Soft	
 Vespula	2010	Hard	Mass Effect
 Ironclad	2010	Metal	
 Scarab	2010	Hard	White/BF3
 Tron	2010	Hard	
 Manticor	2012	Hard	
 Invicta	2012	Metal	White
 Goliathus	2013	Soft	
 Destructor V2	2013	Hard	
 Megasoma V2	2013	Soft	
 Goliathus	2014	Soft	
 Firefly	2015	Hard	
 Goliathus	2016	Soft	
 Firefly Cloth	2016	Soft	
 Gigantus	2016	Soft	
 Vespula V2	2017	Hard	
 Hyperflux	2018	Hard	
 Firefly V2 	2019	Hard	
 Acari	2020	Hard	
 Strider	2021	Soft

Razer Pro Solution 2007 

 Pro Pad	2007	Mat	Speed+Control
 Pro Click v1.6	2007	Mouse	Blue
 Pro Click Mobile	2007	Mouse	black/white/pink/red
 Pro Type	2007	Keyboard	Blue
 Pro Tone M100	2007	Headphones	
 Pro Tone M250	2007	Headphones

Razer Pro Solution 2020 

 Pro Type	2020	Keyboard	Ultra
 Pro Click	2020	Mouse	Mini
 Pro Glide	2020	Mat

Keypads 

 Nostromo	2010	Blue	Hyperesponse
 Orbweaver	2013	Green	Mechanic
 Orbweaver Chroma	2018	Chroma	Mechanic
 Orbweaver Chroma Stealth	2021	Chroma	Mechanic
 Orbweaver Stealth	2012	Green	Mechanic
 Tartarus	2013	Green	Membrane
 Tartarus Chroma	2018	Chroma	Mechanic
 Tartarus Pro	2019	Chroma	Optical
 Tartarus V2	2017	Chroma	Mechamembrane

Watch 
 Nabu	2014	Smart Band	
 Nabu X	2015	Smart Band	White/Green/PaX
 Nabu Watch 	2016	Smart Watch	Forged Edition
 Razer × Panerai	2021		Powered by Razer
 Razer × Fossil	2021	Smart Watch	Powered by Razer

Controllers 

 Hydra	2011	VR	
 Onza	2011	Gamepad XBOx 360 (Tournament Eition)
 Sabertooth 2013 Gamepad XBOX 360
 Atrox	2014	Arcade	XBOX One
 Panthera	2018	Arcade	Evo
 Raiju	2018	Gamepad PS	Ultimate
 Raiju Mobile	2018	Telephone	
 Raiju Tournament Edition	2018	Gamepad XBOX	Mercury
 Junglecat	2019	Telephone	
 Wolverine	2019	Gamepad XBOX	TE/Ultimate/V2/Chroma
 Raion Fightpad for PS4	2020	Fightpad	
 Kishi	2020	Telephone	Iphone

Razer Deathadder Types 
 Razer Deathadder Pax 2008
 Razer Deathadder Destiny 2
 Razer Deathadder Transformers Silver/Yellow/Purple/Red
 Razer Deathadder Black
 Razer Deathadder Respawn Counter Logic Gaming (CLG)
 Razer Deathadder CrossFire Red/Blue/Silver/Gold
 Razer Deathadder Silver / NZ Collector’s Edition 
 Razer Deathadder World of Tanks
 Razer Deathadder Chroma Rise of The Tomb Raider
 Razer Deathadder White
 Razer Deathadder Guild Wars
 Razer Deathadder CPL
 Razer Deathadder Command and Conquer
 Razer Deathadder Zhu Xian II
 Razer Deathadder Counter Logic Gaming (CLG)
 Razer Deathadder Dragon Age II
 Razer Deathadder Chroma Deus Ex
 Razer Deathadder World Cyber Games (WCG)
 Razer Deathadder Voodoo
 Razer Deathadder Chroma Call of Duty Black Ops III
 Razer Deathadder for MAC OS X
 Razer Deathadder Left-handed edition
 Razer Deathadder Expert
 Razer Deathadder Serious Gaming
 Razer Deathadder Team Liquid
 Razer Deathadder Chroma Overwatch
 Razer Deathadder Crossfire (2017)

Laptops

eGPUs 

Compatibility for Razer Blade models with Razer Core eGPU's are as follows:

Razer Blade Stealth - All Models Supported
Razer Blade 14” (2016) - GTX970M or Newer
Razer Blade 15" - All Models Supported
Razer Blade Pro - Razer Blade Pro 17” (2016) or Newer (GTX1080 models are not supported)

For specific model numbers see table below:

Capture cards

Phones

Monitors

Webcams

Gaming chairs

Software and financial services
 Razer Synapse is software downloaded from Razer to configure the RGB lighting and change the settings of Razer peripherals. It is necessary to take full advantage of Razer peripherals, as options such as keyboard macros and mouse DPI settings cannot be configured without the software. An account must be created with Razer to use the software.
 Razer SoftMiner is a program that aims to use the time when a computer is turned on. It runs using the GammaNow compute engine to solve blockchain algorithms and rewards users with Razer Silver.
 In July 2018, Razer made its debut in Malaysia by launching an e-wallet service called Razer Pay.
 In February 2019, Razer announced it was closing its Razer Game Store as part of the company's realignment plans.

References 

Computer peripherals
Razer
Razer products
Razer